Romeo and Juliet (Spanish: Romeo y Julieta) is a 1943 Mexican comedy film directed by Miguel M. Delgado and starring Cantinflas, María Elena Marqués and Ángel Garasa. It is loosely based on William Shakespeare's tragedy Romeo and Juliet. The film's dialogue is in verse.

Cast
 Cantinflas as Romeo 
 María Elena Marqués as Julieta  
 Ángel Garasa as Fray Lorenzo  
 Andrés Soler as Capulet  
 Emma Roldán as Lady Capulet 
 José Baviera as Paris 
 Pedro Elviro 
 Guillermo Familiar
 Juan Garcia
 Conchita Gentil Arcos 
 Rafael Icardo
 Maria de la Paz Jarero
 Tito Junco
 Manuel Noriega 
 José Ortiz de Zárate 
 Jorge Reyes 
 Humberto Rodríguez 
 Estanislao Shilinsky

References

Bibliography 
 Daniel Balderston, Mike Gonzalez & Ana M. Lopez. Encyclopedia of Contemporary Latin American and Caribbean Cultures. Routledge, 2002.

External links 
 

1943 films
1940s historical comedy films
Mexican historical comedy films
1940s Spanish-language films
Films based on Romeo and Juliet
Films directed by Miguel M. Delgado
Mexican black-and-white films
1943 comedy films
1940s Mexican films